Popping is a street dance adapted out of the earlier Boogaloo (funk dance) cultural movement in Oakland, California. As Boogaloo spread, it would be referred to as Robottin in Richmond, California, Strutting movements in San Francisco and San Jose, and the Strikin dances of the Oak Park community of Sacramento which were popular through the mid-1960s to the 1970s. Popping would be eventually adapted from earlier Boogaloo (freestyle dance) movements in Fresno, California, in the late 1970s by way of California high-school gatherings of track & meet events - the West Coast Relays. The dance is rooted through the rhythms of live funk music, and is based on the technique of Boogaloo's posing approach, quickly contracting and relaxing muscles to cause a jerk or can be a sudden stop in the dancer's body, referred to as a pose, pop or a hit. This is done continuously to the rhythm of a song in combination with various movements and poses. It was popularized by a Fresno & Long Beach-based dance group called the Electric Boogaloos that mixed popping techniques to boogaloo. Closely related illusory dance styles and techniques are often integrated into popping to create a more varied performance. These dance styles include the robot, waving and tutting. However, popping is distinct from breaking and locking, with which it is often confused. A popping dancer is commonly referred to as a popper.

Because of popping's cultural Boogaloo roots, popping developed before Hiphop's cultural movement and helped influence the tradition of styles of hip hop dancing. It is often performed in battles, where participants try to outperform each other in front of a crowd, giving room for improvisation and freestyle moves that are seldom seen in shows and performances, such as interaction with other dancers and spectators. Popping and related styles such as waving and tutting have also been incorporated into the electronica dance scene to some extent, influencing new styles such as liquid and digits and turfing.

Terminology
As stated earlier, popping has become the latest umbrella term for a group of closely related styles and techniques rooted in the Boogaloo tradition that have often been combined, evolved or danced together with popping, some of which are seldom seen outside of popping contexts.

Characteristics

Popping is centered around the technique of popping, which means to quickly contract and relax muscles to create a jerking effect (a pop or hit) in the body. It is also known as Posing Hard from the Boogaloo tradition, this technique was innovated by the Boogaloo group, the Black Messengers from Oakland. Popping can be concentrated to specific body parts, creating variants such as arm pops, leg pops, chest pops and neck pops.

Music
Having its roots in the late 1970s funk era, popping is commonly danced to funk and disco music. Popular artists include Zapp, Dayton, Dazz Band and Cameo. During the 1980s, many poppers also utilized electro music, with artists such as Kraftwerk, Yellow Magic Orchestra, Egyptian Lover and World Class Wrecking Crew. More mainstream hip hop music was also employed by poppers during the 1980s, including Afrika Bambaataa, Kurtis Blow, Whodini and Run DMC. Today, it is common to see popping danced to more current music genres such as modern hip hop (often abstract/instrumental hip hop) and various forms of electronic dance music such as dubstep.

Songs that are generally favored have a straight and steady beat at around 90-120 beats per minute, a 4/4 time signature and a strong emphasis on the back beat, normally by a snare drum or a drum machine. The pops performed by the popper normally occur on every beat or on the distinct back beats. The popper can also choose to follow the music more freely such as by timing the pops to the rhythm of a melody or other rhythmic elements. Although it is important to remember the popping should be done consistently to the kick and snare of the music almost consistently as to not stray to far away from the element of its origins.

Variations 

 Animation
 A style and a technique where the dancer imitates film characters being animated by stop motion. The technique of moving rigidly and jerky by tensing muscles and using techniques similar to strobing and the robot makes it appear as if the dancer has been animated frame by frame. Walt Disney was the first to use this term, referring to his character Steam Boat Willie’s motions as "the animation dance" in 1929. This style was heavily inspired by the dynamation films created by Ray Harryhausen, such as The Seventh Voyage of Sinbad (1958).

 Boogaloo
 Boogaloo or "bug'n" is an older umbrella name of funk dances originating in Oakland, California. It can be described as a free-form dance style with loose movements trying to give the impression of a body lacking bones, partly inspired by animated movies and cartoons. It utilizes circular rolls of various body parts, such as the hips, chest, shoulders, knees and head - this technique is also referred to as "wormin" and isolates sections of the body toward funk rhythms, especially sectioning through separating the rib cage from the hip. "Wormin" was innovated by Jerry Rentie of One Plus One., and the rolling of the chest or "wiggling" was innovated by Donald "Duck" Mathews. It also makes heavy use of angles and various steps and transitions to get from one spot to the next.

 Tutting/King Tut
 Inspired by the art of Ancient Egypt (the name derived from the Egyptian pharaoh Tutankhamun, colloquially known as "King Tut"), tutting exploits the body's ability to create geometric positions (such as boxes) and movements, predominantly with the use of right angles. It generally focuses on the arms and hands, and includes sub-styles such as finger tutting.

Notable poppers

 Boogaloo Shrimp (aka Michael Chambers)
 Pop'n'taco (aka Bruno Falcon)
 Popin' Pete
 Prince Ali
 Nonstop
 Mr. Wiggles
 Salah
 Slim Boogie
Mr. Animation
 Poppin John
JC Joint Control NYC

See also
 Hip-hop dance
 Locking (dance)
 Turfing

References

External links

Popping (dance)
Funk dance
Syllabus-free dance
Hip hop dance
Street dance